"Dile" (English: "Tell Him") is the first single from Don Omar's debut album, The Last Don (2003). It was released airplay in May 2004, and released in iTunes on July 25, 2005 along with the track "Intocable". The song samples Joe Arroyo's 1988 song "La Noche".

Chart performance
The recording received considerable airplay success. It was charted on all the Latin Billboard singles charts peaking at number 47 on the Billboard Hot Latin Songs, peaking at number 8 on the Tropical Songs and number 37 both on the Latin Pop Songs, as on the Regional Mexican Songs.  The song was also charted on the French Singles Chart at number 46, and number 48 on the Swedish Singles Chart.

Track listings
iTunes Digital download
 "Dile" — 3:25
 "Intocable" — 2:46

CD Single (European CD)
 "Dile" (Album Version) — 3:25
 "Dale Don Dale" — 3:32
 "Dale Don Mas Duro" — 2:41

CD Single (Maxi CD)
 "Dile" (Album Version) — 3:25
 "Provocandome" (Album Version) — 2:12
 "Intocable" (Remix by DJ Casanova) — 1:45
 "Dile" (Music Video)

Charts

Release history

References

External links
 Don Omar Official Site 

2004 singles
2005 singles
Reggaeton songs
Spanish-language songs
Don Omar songs
Songs written by Eliel (producer)
2003 songs
Machete Music singles